The Iran Computer and Video Games Foundation (ICVGF), also known as the National Foundation for Computer Games (NFCG), is an Iranian nonprofit organization established by the Ministry of Culture and Islamic Guidance to control and support the video game industry in Iran.

Established in 2007, the ICVGF is responsible for publishing and releasing video games, supporting Iranian video game developers, teaching video game development, and monitoring the activities of LAN gaming centers in Iran. The ICVGF is also responsible for banning foreign video games that are not compatible with Iran's political views, and filtering video game websites that do not meet governmental rules.

Duties 

The main duties of the ICVGF are:
 Supporting and promoting game development in Iran
 Educating Iranian game designers, developers, and artists in Iran
 Managing the Entertainment Software Rating Association and the Game Development Institute
 Hosting officially-sanctioned gaming conventions and game jams in Iran
 Promoting Iranian video games at regional and international gaming conventions and trade fairs
 Governing and controlling video game sales in the Iranian market

Video game bans 
One of the responsibilities of the ICVGF is to ban video games that do not meet Iranian ideals or do not follow the Iranian government's media regulations. This is often done in conjunction with the Islamic Revolutionary Guard Corps. One notable ban was the 2016 video game 1979 Revolution: Black Friday, which, according to the ICVGF, presented "false and distorted information" about the Iranian Revolution. The ICVGF blocked websites offering the game, and conducted an operation to confiscate all copies of the game in Iran. In 2012, the ICVGF denied Bohemia Interactive a license to sell Arma 3 in Iran due to its depiction of the Iran Armed Forces. Arma 3's plot depicts Iran as a leading member of the fictional coalition "CSAT", an antagonistic faction that fights the player's faction, NATO.

Organization

Entertainment Software Rating Association 

In 2007, the ICVGF established the Entertainment Software Rating Association (ESRA), a self-regulatory organization that assigns age and content ratings for video games released in Iran.

Iran Game Development Institute 
In 2010, the ICVGF established the Iran Game Development Institute (IGDI), a video game development school, made for the purpose of training Iranian video game designers and developers. The IGDI regularly participates in game jams and gaming conventions hosted by the ICVGF, and often wins awards from them.

Festivals and exhibitions 

The ICVGF hosts gaming conventions and game jams in Iran for the purpose of garnering wider appeal for Iranian video games and the Iranian video game industry.

References

External links
 Official website
 Tehran Game Festival 

2007 establishments in Iran
Video game organizations
Censorship in Iran